Lara Moreno (19 January 1978 in Seville) is a Spanish writer.

Biography 
Moreno lives in Madrid where she also works as an editor and teacher of creative writing. She is the author of volumes of poetry, essays, and short stories as well as two novels. In 2017, she was selected to replace Alberto Olmos as the guest editor of the Penguin Random House imprint Caballo de Troya.

Books

Novels
 Por si se va la luz (2013, Lumen).
 Piel de lobo (2016, Lumen), translated into English as Wolfskin by Katie Whittemore (2022, Structo Press)
 La ciudad (2022, Lumen).

Short story collections
 Cuatro veces fuego (2008, Tropo Editores)
 Casi todas las tijeras (2004, Editorial Quórum)

Essays
 Deshabitar (2020, Planeta de Libros).

Poetry
 Tuve una jaula (2019, La Bella Varsovia)
 Después de la apnea (2013, Ediciones del 4 de Agosto)
 La herida costumbre (2008, Puerta del Mar)
Tempestad en víspera de viernes (2020, Lumen)

References 

1978 births
Living people
21st-century Spanish writers
21st-century Spanish poets
21st-century Spanish women writers
People from Seville
Spanish women poets